Masala is an Italian surname. Notable people with the name include:

 Carlo Masala (born 1968), German political scientist
 Daniele Masala (born 1955), Italian pentathlete
 Stéphane Masala (born 1976), French football player and manager

See also 

 Masala (disambiguation)